This article features the discography of Kosovo-Albanian rapper Capital T. His discography includes three studio albums, a mixtape and numerous singles as a lead artist and featured artist.

Albums

Studio albums

Mixtapes

Singles

As lead artist

As featured artist

References

External links 

Discographies of Albanian artists